L. melanoleuca may refer to:
 Lalage melanoleuca, a bird species endemic to the Philippines
 Lamprospiza melanoleuca, a small passerine bird species
 Leucosarcia melanoleuca, a pigeon species

See also
 Melanoleuca (disambiguation)